Prima Love is the first niche channel aimed at young, active women in the Czech Republic. The channel, which launched on March 8, 2011, is owned by Modern Times Group and currently has a reach of approximately 94% of the country's 10.5 million people and broadcasts 18 hours per day.

Prima Love showcases top foreign series, soap-operas and movies targeted at young female viewers. This includes MTG's own regionally produced programs such as Czech Family Ties, highly rated US series such as Desperate Housewives, the most popular and newest Latin American soap-operas such as ¿Dónde Está Elisa?, romantic movies targeted at female viewers as well as infotainment shows such as The Oprah Winfrey Show.

The channel wants to extend its programming including highly rated foreign titles as well as gradually delivered locally produced content relevant to its audience.

Telenovelas

MTG's regionally produced programs

Airing currently
About My Family and Other Corpses
Ways to Home (all season)

Ended
Airport
Family Ties (all season)
Ugly Kate
Very fragile relationships (all season)

TV series

Airing currently
Bones
Castle
Ghost Whisperer
Gigolos
T@gged
Riverdale
Light as a Feather
Grey's Anatomy
How I Met Your Mother
In Plain Sight
Law & Order
Men in Trees
Renegade
Roseanne
Sex and the City
The Closer
The Finder
The Good Wife
The L Word
Trauma
Weeds

Coming soon

Ended
7th Heaven (season 8)
A Touch of Frost (all seasons)
Ally McBeal (all seasons)
Bent
Blue Bloods (season 1-2)
Boston Legal (all seasons)
Der Bulle von Tölz (all season)
Desperate Housewives (season 5-8)
Fairly Legal (all seasons)
Five Sisters
Frasier (season 10)
Free Agents
G-Spot (all season)
Glee (seasons 1-3)
Gossip Girl (seasons 1-5)
Hot in Cleveland (season 1-3)
Charmed (all seasons)
Inspector Rex (season 4-10)
JAG (all seasons)
Julie Lescaut (all seasons)
Life (all seasons)
Lipstick Jungle (all seasons)
Lewis (all seasons)
Love Bites
Medium (all seasons)
Mental
Mercy
Modern Family (season 1-2)
Parenthood (seasons 1-3)
Perfect Couples
Pretty Little Liars (seasons 1-2)
Reba (all seasons)
Revenge (seasons 1)
Sabrina, the Teenage Witch (all seasons)
Secret Diary of a Call Girl (season 1-2)
The Defenders
The Division (all seasons)
The Drew Carey Show (all seasons)
The Ex List
The Gates
The Nanny (all seasons)
The Riches (all seasons)
White Collar (season 1-3)

TV shows

Airing currently
Beauty and the Geek  (all seasons)
Candy Queen (all seasons)
Hoarding: Buried Alive  (all seasons)
Cheaters  (all seasons)
My Strange Addiction  (all seasons)
Sweet Home Alabama (all seasons)
Wife Swap USA (season 1-10)
World's Worst Mom (all seasons)

Coming soon
Martha
The Naked Chef

Ended
Ace of Cakes  (season 1-2)
Abby & Brittany
America's Got Talent  (season 7)
America's Next Top Model (season 1-6)
Debbie Travis' Facelift (all seasons)
Extreme Makeover: Weight Loss Edition (season 1)
Face Off  (season 1-2)
How Clean Is Your House?  (all seasons)
Jamie at Home  (all seasons)
Jamie's Family Christmas
Jamie's 30 Minute Meals
Fabulous Cakes (all seasons)
Fat Chef (season 1)
Oliver's Twist
Planet Cake (all seasons)
Ricardo and Friends (all seasons)
Shipwrecked (season 1-2)
Supersize vs Superskinny  (season 1-6)
The Oprah Winfrey Show (season 25)
The Real Housewives of Beverly Hills  (season 1-5)
The Real Housewives of Orange County  (season 1-5)
The Simple Life  (all seasons)
The Talk  (season 1-2)
The X Factor U.S.  (season 2)
Ultimate Cake Off  (all seasons)
World's Most Wonderful Hotels (season 1-2)

External links
Official Site
Program TV Prima Love

Television stations in the Czech Republic
Modern Times Group
Czech-language television stations
Television channels and stations established in 2011
Prima televize